Jacobson is an unincorporated community in Ball Bluff Township, Aitkin County, Minnesota, United States.

Formerly a logging town known as "Mississippi Landing", it is named after Paul Jacobson, who served as the first postmaster.

Minnesota State Highways 65 and 200 are two of the main routes in the community.

Community

Jacobson consists of a gas station, Mississippi Landing; a campground right off the banks of the river; three churches of different denominations; and a bar, The Forestry Station. There is also a park with a baseball diamond and a playground.

References

Unincorporated communities in Minnesota
Unincorporated communities in Aitkin County, Minnesota
Minnesota populated places on the Mississippi River